Taima-dera (當麻寺) is a Buddhist temple in Katsuragi, Nara, Japan. The temple legend says it was built originally in 612 by the Imperial Prince Maroko, the brother of Prince Shotoku. The temple was moved to its present location in 681 by the grandson of Prince Maroko, and served as the head temple, or honzan (本山) of the Hosso sect although currently the temple is jointly administrated by Shingon and Jodo schools.

The temple's main object of veneration is Maitreya Bodhisattva, but the most popular attraction is the Taima Mandala, a graphical representation of the Sukhavati Pure Land, and pilgrimage site for Pure Land Buddhists. It is believed that the Taima Mandala was woven in one day by Princess Chujo-hime.

Architecture

Taima-dera is the only temple in Japan to have its original twin pagodas intact, which date from around AD 710. The surrounding gardens are renowned for peonies in May and a large lotus pond which blooms in June.

The temple consists of the three main halls, the Main Mandala Hall, Kondou and Koudou and various sub-temples, the main ones being, Okunoin, Seinanin, Nakanobo and Gonenin. They contain Buddhist statues, Buddhist paintings and craft products, many of which are national treasures and important cultural properties.

Main Mandala Hall

The Mandala Hall also known as the Hondou is the main hall at Taima-dera and it houses the Taima-Mandala, an important national treasure.

Kondou

At the time of construction, the Kondou was designated as the main hall at Taima-dera before switching to the Main Mandala Hall. It houses a statue of Maitreya Bodhisattva which is Japan's oldest clay statue of the Buddha.

Koudou

The Koudou is situated opposite to the kondou and houses many beautiful Buddhist statues dating from the 9th to 12th century.

Okunoin Temple (Inner Temple)

Okunoin temple is situated at the west end of the temple.  It contains the Jodo Garden (Garden of Pure Land) which is the largest garden representing the paradise shown in the Taima Mandala. There are peonies, colored leaves, and other flowers bloom throughout the year.

Sainanin Temple (South-West Temple) 

The South-west temple was originally built to be a guardian temple near the back gate. There are three statues of Kannon which worshipped in its main hall and in the back there is a beautiful garden made in the early Edo era.

Nakanobo Temple (Middle Temple)

It is the oldest temple in Taima-dera and has a beautiful garden with a tea ceremony house.

Gonenin Temple (Praying Temple)

Gonenin temple is said to have been the residence of Chujyo-hime. This temple houses the masks and costumes representing Boddhisatvas which are used in the Neri-Kuyo Eshiki event described below.

Events

The most famous event at Taima-dera is the Neri-Kuyo Eshiki which is a special memorial parade for Princess Chujo. It features a procession of twenty-five priests wearing masks and special costumes representing Bodhisattvas and who re-enact the world depicted by the Taima Mandala. They walk and dance across a long bridge, which is believed to link this world with the Pure Land, giving hope to commoners that they, too, one day may reach the Pure land.

See also 
List of National Treasures of Japan (temples)
List of National Treasures of Japan (crafts-others)
List of National Treasures of Japan (sculptures)
Taema (Noh play)
For an explanation of terms concerning Japanese Buddhism, Japanese Buddhist art, and Japanese Buddhist temple architecture, see the Glossary of Japanese Buddhism.

External links
 。
 Taima-dera Homepage - English
 Taima-dera Homepage - Japanese only
 Amida Net - Explanation of Taima Mandala
 Photos of Taima-dera

Buddhist temples in Nara Prefecture
National Treasures of Japan
Places of Scenic Beauty
Important Cultural Properties of Japan
Historic Sites of Japan
Kōyasan Shingon temples
Maitreya
7th-century Buddhist temples
Religious buildings and structures completed in 612